Tarik Bengelloun (Arabic: طارق بنجلون, Greek: Ταρίκ Μπεντζελούν), born 8 February 1991 in France, is a French former footballer who is last known to have played for Paris B in his home country.

Career

Bengelloun started his senior career with Nantes. In 2011, he signed for Enosis Neon Paralimni in the Cypriot First Division, where he made one appearance and scored zero goals. After that, he played for French clubs Le Havre AC B, Pau, US Colomiers Football, Moulins Yzeure Foot, AS Poissy, and Paris B.

References

External links 
 Ton Ton signing target in ban mystery 
 Tidser hails Ton signing of French duo 
 Ton strikers face shoot-out 
 Transfer Horror Story: Επεισόδιο 1 
 Foot National Profile
 at Footballdatabase.eu
 Greenock Morton (blog) Profile

Living people
1991 births
Association football wingers
Association football midfielders
French footballers
French expatriate footballers
Expatriate footballers in England
Raja CA players
French sportspeople of Moroccan descent
FC Nantes players
Nottingham Forest F.C. players
Racing Club de France Football players
Enosis Neon Paralimni FC players
Le Havre AC players
Pau FC players
US Colomiers Football players
AS Poissy players
Paris FC players
Expatriate footballers in Morocco
Expatriate footballers in Cyprus
Greenock Morton F.C. players
Expatriate footballers in Scotland
Association football forwards
Moroccan expatriate sportspeople in Cyprus